Jaye Robinson is a Canadian politician who has served as a member of the Toronto City Council since 2010. She was the chair of the Toronto Transit Commission (TTC) board from 2018 to 2022. Robinson represents Ward 15 Don Valley West.

Background and personal life 

Robinson is a fourth generation Torontonian, her great-grandfather, John Robinson, was editor with the defunct Toronto Telegram. She spent 20 years working for the City of Toronto, including as the director of events with the Economic Development and Culture Division, where she helped to organize Nuit Blanche.

On 29 October 2019, Robinson was diagnosed with breast cancer and took a temporary leave of absence from council. She returned to council meetings in November 2020, although her attendance was done remotely due to the COVID-19 pandemic.

Political career

Robinson ran for councillor in Ward 25 in the 2003 city council election against the incumbent Cliff Jenkins The close race was marked by an election night error. The city website announced that, with all the ballots in, Jenkins had lost to Robinson by 30 votes. However, only 90 per cent of the votes had actually been counted, and by the time the full count was completed two hours later, Jenkins had pulled into the lead by 80 votes and held on to win.

Robinson ran again in Ward 25 in the 2010 city council election, narrowly defeating incumbent Cliff Jenkins. She was re-elected in the 2014 city council election. During the 2014-2018 Council term she held several important Committee positions serving as Chair of the Public Works and Infrastructure Committee and as a member of the Executive Committee and Striking Committee.

Robinson ran again for Councillor for Toronto City Council in the 2018 municipal election in the newly constituted Ward 15 Don Valley West, which has the same boundaries as the federal and provincial ridings with the same name. She defeated the incumbent councillor for former Ward 26, Jon Burnside. Following the election, Mayor John Tory announced that Robinson would serve as the chair of the TTC, a position she held until 2022 when Tory appointed her to lead the city's plan for the 2026 FIFA World Cup.

Alex Bozikovic, The Globe and Mails architecture critic, described Jaye Robinson as "furiously anti-development". She has been listed as one of "three Toronto councillors hopelessly exacerbating the housing crisis" by More Neighbours Toronto.

Electoral history

Official results.

References

External links

Living people
Toronto city councillors
Women municipal councillors in Canada
Women in Ontario politics
Year of birth missing (living people)